Elections to Barnsley Metropolitan Borough Council were held on 5 May 1988, with one third of the council and an additional vacancy in Dearne Thurnscoe up for election. Prior to the election, the defending councillor in Darton had defected from Labour to Independent. The election resulted in Labour retaining control of the council.

Election result

This resulted in the following composition of the council:

Ward results

+/- figures represent changes from the last time these wards were contested.

By-elections between 1988 and 1990

References

1988 English local elections
1988
1980s in South Yorkshire